Miss Uzbekistan was supposedly a national beauty pageant in Uzbekistan whose winner would participate in the Miss World international pageant.

History
In 2013, Rakhima Ganieva was the first Miss World contestant to represent Uzbekistan. Her presence there was controversial. She began taking part in Miss World 2013 for Uzbekistan. She claimed that the Miss Uzbekistan 2013 pageant was held on 20 July 2013 in Tashkent. Officials at the Uzbek Culture and Sports Ministry and the National Committee on Women were unaware that the country had held a contest.

Titleholders
Color key

Representative to Miss World

Representative to Miss Intercontinental

Representative to Miss International

Representative to Miss CosmoWorld

References

Uzbekistan
Recurring events established in 2013
Beauty pageants in Uzbekistan
Uzbekistani awards
Uzbekistan